is a Japanese professional futsal club, they play in the Kansai Futsal League. The team is located in Ashiya, Hyōgo, Japan.

See also
 Japan Football Association (JFA)

References

External links
 Official website 

Futsal in Japan
Hyōgo Prefecture